Gauri Pundah (also spelt as Gauri Punda) is a village in Fatuha development block of district Patna in the state of Bihar, India. It is situated on the banks of the river Mahatmain ( principal branch of river Falgu before disappearing in 'Taal' area of Mokama). This village consists of six settlements (or tolas in local parlance) viz Gauri, Gyaspur (near Varuna village), Abdalchak (near Shivchak village) and three settlements of Pundah (consisting two tolas - Deeh and Narayanpur besides a tola called 'Tari Par' near Mahatmain river basin). Gauri Pundah thus is the largest village in the surrounding region. It has a population of more than two thousands and a half.

History and culture

History and culture of Gauri Pundah village is very rich. The first part of the name of this village reflects the name of the mother goddess Gauri, the consort of Lord Shiva, whereas the second part Pundah has a famous rural temple known as Mahadeo Sthan, dedicated entirely to the worship of Shiva. This temple is so famous in the region that people from the nearby villages throng to it to offer prayers to Lord Shiva particularly on the occasion of Mahashivratri and Shravan Masa as per Vikram Calendar. Nearby located are Saptamatrika (seven mother goddesses, consorts of various Hindu gods) temple and Mahavir Sthan (temple dedicated to Lord Hanumana). Traits of a typical Magadhan culture are seen aplenty in this village.

Geography

Gauri Pundah is situated on the banks of the river Mahatmain ( principal branch of river Falgu before disappearing in 'Taal' area of Mokama). It is also connected to river Dhoba (another branch of river Falgu) through a traditional aquatic channel. This village consists of five settlements (or tolas in local parlance) viz Gauri, Gyaspur (near Varuna village), Abdalchak (near Shivchak village) and three settlements of Pundah (consisting two tolas - Deeh and Narayanpur besides a tola called 'Tari Par' near Mahatmain river basin). Gauri Pundah thus is the largest village in the surrounding region. It has a population of more than two thousands and half.

Economy

Gauri Pundah is an agrarian economy. Main crops include all types of cereals, vegetable, pulses, etc. The village is dependent on local markets of Fatuha and Daniyawan for commercial activities.

Demographics

Gauri Pundah consists of a large number of agricultural communities and labourers. Backward and Dalit communities form more than 98% of the population. Amongst the Dalits, extremely downtrodden communities, which are also known as Mahadalits, are prevalent here, mainly in form of Musahar. "Musahar" word came from a Sanskrit word Mushahara (meaning rat-eaters). These people used to provide maximum benefit to the farmers by eating the rodents which were hugely detrimental to the crops and by making themselves available as agricultural labour. Amongst farming communities, Kurmis and Yadavas are dominant as also is the overall case in the state of Bihar. The main beneficiary of the traditional social structure nowadays are these sections of backward communities in addition to the upper castes, which include only Brahmins, being the most regular beneficiary of the system who enjoyed traditional advantage in the feudalistic caste-ridden Indian society. Still, a vast majority of the people are yet to get any benefits arising due to modern development as they have been traditionally kept in such darkness by the higher communities who never cared to uplift them. Many extremely backward castes, Dalit and Mahadalit communities are landless, only supplying agricultural and other manual labour to the village. Their condition is very miserable and they lack all the basic amenities of the life. It is happening due to still prevailing feudal nature of the rural society here. They are yet to be liberated from the vicious cycle of abject poverty. Literacy level is below 80%, particularly low amongst women and dalit communities.

There has been some advancement in the village. But, its fruits have all been cornered by the higher sections of the society leaving the landless to suffer in eternity.

Recent developments

The village now is ready to witness the taste of Bihar's growth story. Gauri Pundah is selected under the Rajiv Gandhi Gramin Vidyutikaran Yojana (RGGVY) to ensure rural electrification of this village. Ironically, the village was electrified till 1980. After that, it got de-electrified. However efforts are on to provide better facilities to the villagers and steps has been taken to take the voice to the higher authority. The village have a primary school and a middle school is going to open very soon. Villages have to go to Balwa village to study high school courses. Beyond matriculation, villagers go to Fatuha or nearby towns like Bakhtiarpur or Patna the capital city of Bihar.
Gauri Pundah is proposed to be connected through roads to Daniawan and Fatuha markets via Nimi and Suranga Par villages respectively. The work is under progress on these two roads. Recently, the village was surveyed for establishment of a rural healthcare centre and a bridge on river Mahatmain by the local administration.

References

Villages in Patna district